Cole Alexander (born 9 July 1989) is a South African professional soccer player who plays as a central midfielder for Kaizer Chiefs in the Premier Soccer League.

Early and personal life
Alexander was born in Cape Town, and grew up in the Lentegeur neighborhood of Mitchells Plain. He attended Lantana Primary School and later Golden Groove Primary School before attending Witteborne High School in Wynberg.

He is the son-in-law of Duncan Crowie, having married his daughter Jaime in March 2019.

Club career
Cole started his junior career with local side Leeds Lentegeur, and went on to play junior football with Seven Stars, Santos, Hellenic and Ajax Cape Town Juniors.

He started his senior career with Ajax Cape Town in 2008, and had loan spells with Vasco da Gama and Chippa United. He made 43 league appearances for Ajax without scoring.

On 23 June 2014, Cole joined Polokwane City on a two year deal. He made 52 appearances across two seasons at the club, scoring two goals.

In February 2016, Cole signed for SuperSport United on a pre-contract agreement. He made 8 appearances for SuperSport United during the 2016–17 season, and 1 appearance during the 2017–18 season. Subsequently, Cole signed for Bidvest Wits in February 2018, where he made 57 league appearances across two-and-a-half seasons.

On 10 October 2020, he joined Indian Super League club Odisha FC on a two year deal. This made him the first ever South African to play at the highest level of football in India, the Indian Super League. Alexander scored his first goal for the club on 22 December in a 2–2 draw with NorthEast United FC. On 23 July 2021, Cole  mutually terminated his contract with Odisha FC after reaching agreement over an undisclosed fee.

References

External links
 

1989 births
South African soccer players
Association football midfielders
Living people
Cape Town Spurs F.C. players
Sportspeople from Cape Town
Cape Coloureds
Vasco da Gama (South Africa) players
Chippa United F.C. players
Polokwane City F.C. players
SuperSport United F.C. players
Bidvest Wits F.C. players
Odisha FC players
South African expatriate soccer players
Expatriate footballers in India
South African expatriate sportspeople in India